St Mary's Church of England High School is a  mixed secondary school and sixth form located in Cheshunt, Hertfordshire, England. It is a Church of England school under the direction of the Diocese of St Albans.

St Mary's High School was previously located next to the Church of St Mary the Virgin in Cheshunt, but moved to a new site in the town in April 2010. The school converted to academy status in August 2012.

St Mary's High School offers GCSEs as courses of study for pupils, with A Levels offered in the sixth form. Some vocational courses are also offered in conjunction with Hertford Regional College.

Notable former pupils
Victoria Beckham, former member of the Spice Girls
Declan McKenna, singer/songwriter and winner of the 2015 Glastonbury Festival Emerging Talent Contest

Notable former faculty
 Katherine Jenkins, singer.

References

External links
Official website

Secondary schools in Hertfordshire
Church of England secondary schools in the Diocese of St Albans
Academies in Hertfordshire
Educational institutions established in 1958
1958 establishments in England
Cheshunt